Le Marginal is a 1983 French crime film directed by Jacques Deray and starring Jean-Paul Belmondo. The music for the film was composed by Ennio Morricone.

Plot 
Policeman Philippe Jordan works in Marseille. He intercepts the delivery of a shipload of heroin by jumping out of a helicopter onto a speedboat and throws all drugs into the sea. Drug lord Mecacci is desperate to get rid of Jordan and arranges an incident which leads to Jordan's disciplinary transfer. Jordan continues to fight against the drug cartel after all. He finds a valuable witness named "Freddy, the chemist" but Mecacci has Freddy killed before he can testify. When Mecacci's henchmen also murder Jordan's old friend Francis Pierron, Jordan retaliates immediately. Now Mecacci tries to lure him into a deadly trap. After Jordan has outsmarted  Mecacci's killers he confronts their boss. The time for the final showdown has come.

Cast 
 Jean-Paul Belmondo as Philippe Jordan
 Henry Silva as Sauveur Mecacci
 Carlos Sotto Mayor as Livia Maria Dolores 
 Pierre Vernier as Inspector Rojinski
 Maurice Barrier as Tonton
  as Antonio Baldi
 Tchéky Karyo as Francis Pierron
 Michel Robin as Alfred Gonet
 Jean-Claude Dreyfus as The transvestite

Reception
"Le Marginal" was described as a "typical Jean-Paul Belmondo vehicle". With 4,956,922 tickets sold, it was the third most watched feature film in France in 1983.

References

External links 
 
Le Marginal at Le Film Guide
 Le Marginal at Cinéma-Français 

1983 films
1980s crime action films
1980s action thriller films
1980s crime thriller films
French crime action films
French action thriller films
French crime thriller films
Films directed by Jacques Deray
Films set in Marseille
Films about organized crime in France
Films about the illegal drug trade
Films with screenplays by Michel Audiard
1980s French-language films
1980s French films